Carmilla is a 2019 British romantic horror film written and directed by Emily Harris. It stars Jessica Raine, Hannah Rae, Devrim Lingnau, Tobias Menzies and Scott Silven. Set in the 19th century, the screenplay is inspired by Sheridan Le Fanu's 1871 novella of the same name. The film had its world premiere at the Edinburgh International Film Festival on 28 June 2019. It was released in the United Kingdom on 16 October 2020 by Republic Film Distribution.

Premise
Lara lives with her father and her strict governess, Miss Fontaine, in total isolation, and is struggling to find an outlet for her curiosity and burgeoning sexuality. When a carriage crash nearby brings a young woman into the family home to recuperate, Lara is enchanted by Carmilla. The pair strike up a passionate relationship, which strikes fear in the heart of Miss Fontaine, and a complex triangulate emerges between the three women.

Cast

 Jessica Raine as Miss Fontaine
 Hannah Rae as Lara
 Devrim Lingnau as Carmilla
 Tobias Menzies as The Doctor
 Greg Wise as Mr. Bauer
 Scott Silven
 Daniel Tuite as Paul the Stableman
 Lorna Gayle as Margaret

Production

Pre-production
On 17 August 2017, Screen Daily reported that Jessica Raine and Tobias Menzies had been cast in the film, joining Hannah Rae, Devrim Lingnau, and illusionist Scott Silven in the production.

Filming
Principal photography began in East Sussex on 11 September 2017.

Release
Carmilla had its world premiere at the Edinburgh International Film Festival on 28 June 2019. The film was originally set to be released in the United Kingdom on 3 April 2020 by Republic Film Distribution, but it was postponed due to the COVID-19 pandemic; it was ultimately released in cinemas on 16 October 2020 and through video on demand on 19 October. In May 2020, Film Movement acquired U.S. distribution rights to the film and released it in virtual cinemas on 17 July 2020.

References

Further reading

External links
 
 Carmilla at Bird Flight Films
 Carmilla at Altitude Film Entertainment
 Carmilla at British Council – Film

2019 films
2019 horror films
2019 LGBT-related films
2019 romantic drama films
2010s coming-of-age drama films
2010s horror drama films
British coming-of-age drama films
British horror drama films
British LGBT-related films
British romantic drama films
Coming-of-age romance films
Films based on horror novels
Films based on Irish novels
Films based on works by Sheridan Le Fanu
Films postponed due to the COVID-19 pandemic
Films set in the 18th century
Films shot in East Sussex
Lesbian-related films
LGBT-related coming-of-age films
LGBT-related horror films
LGBT-related romantic drama films
Romantic horror films
British vampire films
2010s English-language films
2010s British films